Rhododendron qinghaiense is a species of plant native to Asia. It is one of the 50 fundamental herbs used in traditional Chinese medicine, where it has the name Qīng hǎi dù juān.

Traditional medicine

Rhododendron qinghaiense is one of the 50 fundamental herbs used in traditional Chinese medicine.

References

qinghaiense